Clusia occidentalis is a species of fly in the family Clusiidae.

References

Further reading

External links

 

Clusiidae
Insects described in 1918